Misguided Angel may refer to:

 Misguided Angel, the fifth book in the Blue Bloods novel series
 "Misguided Angel", a song on the album The Trinity Session by Cowboy Junkies